Dale Jamieson (born 1947) is Professor of Environmental Studies and Philosophy at New York University, a scholar of environmental ethics and animal rights, and an analyst of climate change discourse. He also serves as a faculty affiliate for the NYU School of Law and as director of NYU's Animal Studies Initiative, which was funded by Brad Goldberg with a $1 million donation in 2010. In addition to his affiliation with the NYU Departments of Environmental Studies and Philosophy, Jamieson also holds positions at The Dickson Poon School of Law and at the University of the Sunshine Coast in Australia.

Previously, Jamieson had been at Carleton College and the University of Colorado, Boulder, with visiting roles at other universities, including Cornell, Princeton, and Stanford. In 2015, he presented the Arthur C. Wickenden lecture at Miami University. He is a critic of geo-engineering proposals.

Biography 
Jamieson was born in Iowa, in 1947. He grew up in San Diego, California, where he was an avid surfer. He received his B.A. in 1970 from San Francisco State University, and his Ph.D. in philosophy from the University of North Carolina at Chapel Hill in 1976. He began his academic career at North Carolina State University, where he taught as a visiting instructor in philosophy from January 1975 to May 1978.

Selected publications

Animal Liberation is an Environmental Ethic (Environmental Values, 1997)
 Co-editor with Marc Bekoff, Readings in Animal Cognition (The MIT Press, 1995)
 Morality's Progress: Essays on Humans, Other Animals, and the Rest of Nature (Oxford, 2002)
 Ethics and the Environment: An Introduction (Cambridge, 2008)
 Co-editor with Lori Gruen and Chris Schlottmann, Reflecting on Nature: Readings in Environmental Philosophy, 2nd Edition (Oxford, 2012)
 Reason in a Dark Time: Why the Struggle to Stop Climate Change Failed--and What It Means For Our Future (Oxford, 2014)
Love in the Anthropocene: Stories on Human Love in a World Without Nature co-authored with Bonnie Nadzam (OR Books, Sept 2015)

References

Further reading 
 Lindsay Abrams. "The rise and fall of America’s climate deniers: How politics hijacked the fight against global warming" Salon.
 Rob Kanter. "Environmental Almanac: Conservation lecture series at UI begins" in The News-Gazette 2-9-14
 John Leland.  "The Best of West and East" in The New York Times 8-1-2014
 Ruby Shao. "Singer criticizes “speciesism” at animal rights panel"  in Daily Princetonian 10-9-13

1947 births
Living people
American animal rights scholars
Animal cognition writers
Carleton College faculty
Environmental ethicists
Environmental philosophers
New York University faculty
Philosophers from Iowa
University of Colorado Boulder faculty